The Defence Export Promotion Organization (DEPO) is an agency of the Government of Pakistan which is responsible for promoting Pakistan's defence industry. It operates under the Ministry of Defence Production. DEPO organizes the annual two year International Defence Exhibition and Seminar (IDEAS) conference, which takes places at the Karachi Expo Center in Karachi, Pakistan. As of July 2019, the Director General of DEPO is Major General Kamran Ali, HI(M).

References

External links
  Defence Export Promotion Organization (English)

Pakistan federal departments and agencies
Foreign trade of Pakistan
Export promotion agencies